Divergent evolution or divergent selection is the accumulation of differences between closely related populations within a species, sometimes leading to speciation. Divergent evolution is typically exhibited when two populations become separated by a geographic barrier (such as in allopatric or peripatric speciation) and experience different selective pressures that drive adaptations to their new environment. After many generations and continual evolution, the populations become less able to interbreed with one another. The American naturalist J. T. Gulick (1832–1923) was the first to use the term "divergent evolution", with its use becoming widespread in modern evolutionary literature. Classic examples of divergence in nature are the adaptive radiation of the finches of the Galapagos or the coloration differences in populations of a species that live in different habitats such as with pocket mice and fence lizards.

The term can also be applied in molecular evolution, such as to proteins that derive from homologous genes. Both orthologous genes (resulting from a speciation event) and paralogous genes (resulting from gene duplication) can illustrate divergent evolution. Through gene duplication, it is possible for divergent evolution to occur between two genes within a species. Similarities between species that have diverged are due to their common origin, so such similarities are homologies. In contrast, convergent evolution arises when an adaptation has arisen independently, creating analogous structures such as the wings of birds and of insects.

Creation, definition, and usage 
The term divergent evolution is believed to have been first used by J. T. Gulick.  Divergent evolution is commonly defined as what occurs when two groups of the same species evolve different traits within those groups in order to accommodate for differing environmental and social pressures.  Various examples of such pressures can include predation, food supplies, and competition for mates.  The tympanal ears of certain nocturnal insects are believed to be a result of needing the ultrasonic hearing that tympanal ears provide in order to hear predators in the dark.   Non-nocturnal insects - that do not need to fear nocturnal predators - are often found to lack these tympanal ears.

Causes 
Animals undergo divergent evolution for a number of reasons.   Predators or their absence, changes in the environment, and the time at which certain animals are most active are chief among them.

Predators 
A lack of predators – predatory birds and mammals - for cliff-side nest residing kittiwake caused that particular group of kittiwake to lose their ancestral mobbing behavior that had been exhibited up until that point for protecting young.  The mobbing behavior normally displayed by the kittiwake is lost when the kittiwake take residence in this area with little threat from predators towards their young. The mobbing behavior was originally developed to protect ground-level nests containing young from various predators such as reptiles, mammals and other birds.

Environment 
The cliff-side nesting area itself was similarly responsible for the kittiwakes losing their mobbing mentality – predatory mammals small enough to fit on the cliff edges along with the kittiwakes and their offspring would not be able to make the climb up while predatory birds would not be able to maneuver near the cliff face while also being afflicted by the weather conditions of the area.

Distinctions 
Divergent evolution is understood in distinction to convergent evolution, as they are both similar and different in various facets such as whether something evolves, what evolves, and why it evolves.  It is instructive to compare divergent evolution with both convergent and parallel evolution.

Divergent versus convergent evolution 
Convergent evolution is defined as a similar trait evolution that occurs in two otherwise different species of animal as a result of those two species living in similar environments with similar environmental pressures (like predators and food supply). It differs from divergent evolution in that the species involved are different while the traits they obtain do not differ from each other. An example of convergent evolution is the development of horns in various species for sparring over mates, resources, and territory

Divergent versus parallel evolution 
Parallel evolution is the development of a similar trait in species descending from the same ancestor.  It is similar to divergent evolution in that the species descend from the same ancestor, but it differs in that the trait is the same while in divergent evolution the trait is not. An example of parallel evolution is that certain arboreal frog species, 'flying' frogs, in both Old World families and New World families, have developed the ability of gliding flight. They have "enlarged hands and feet, full webbing between all fingers and toes, lateral skin flaps on the arms and legs, and reduced weight per snout-vent length".

Darwin's Finches 
One of the most famous examples of divergent evolution is the case of Darwin's Finches. During Darwin's travels to the Galápagos Islands he discovered several different species of finch that shared a common ancestor.  They lived on varying diets and had beaks that differed in shape and size reflecting their diet. The changes in beak shape and size were believed to be required to support their change in diet. Some Galápagos finches have larger and more powerful beaks to crack nuts with. A different type allows the bird to use cactus spines to spear insects in the bark of trees.

Divergent evolution in dogs
Another good example of divergent evolution is the origin of the domestic dog and the modern wolf. Dogs and wolves both diverged from a common ancestor. The similarity of the mitochondrial DNA sequences from 162 wolves from various parts of the world and 140 dogs of 60 different breeds, revealed by genomic research, further supported the theory that dogs and wolves have diverged from shared ancestry. Dogs and wolves have similar body shape, skull size, and limb formation, further supporting their close genetic makeup and thus shared ancestry. For example, malamutes and huskies are physically and behaviorally similar to wolves. Huskies and malamutes have very similar body size and skull shape. Huskies and wolves share similar coat patterns as well as tolerance to cold. In the hypothetical situations, mutations and breeding events were simulated to show the progression of the wolf behavior over ten generations. The results concluded that even though the last generation of the wolves were more docile and less aggressive, the temperament of the wolves fluctuated greatly from one generation to the next.

See also 
 Cladistics
 Devolution
 Chronospecies

References

Further reading
 

Evolutionary biology
Evolution of animals